Incorruptible was a 40-gun  of the French Navy.

On 15 July 1796, under captain Bescond, she fought against the 56-gun .

In 1800, she was involved in the battle of Dunkirk.

On 4 February, they attacked a convoy, destroying 7 ships. Three days later, they encountered the convoy escorted by the 20-gun sloop  and the 8-gun bomb vessel ; the frigates destroyed two Royal Navy vessels, and captured and burnt  and two other merchant vessels of the convoy.

References

External links
 

Age of Sail frigates of France
Romaine-class frigates
1795 ships
Ships built in France